Ernest Trow Carter (September 3, 1866 – June 22, 1953) was an organist and composer who won the Bispham Award.

Biography
He was born on September 3, 1866, in Orange, New Jersey to Aaron Carter and Sarah Swift Trow. At age seven, in 1873 he started what would become eight years of study of piano with Mary Bradshaw as his teacher. At age thirteen, in 1879, he organized an amateur orchestra, studied the cornet, was assistant conductor of the school orchestra; and at sixteen he was playing cornet in a professional orchestra.

He graduated from Princeton University, cum laude, in 1888. He composed Princeton's Steps Song and arranged  music for the Princeton Glee Club. He studied piano with William Mason and singing with Francis Fisher Powers. He studied the French Horn with Hermann Hand of the New York Symphony Orchestra. He then received a Master's Degree from Columbia University.

He went to California in 1892 as musical director for the Thacher School. In 1894, he went to Berlin to study composition with Wilhelm Freudenberg and organ with Arthur Egidi.

He returned to New York around 1898. There he studied organ with Homer N. Bartlett. From 1899 to 1901 he was lecturer on music and was the choirmaster at Princeton University. For one year, around 1903, he sang in the chorus of the Metropolitan Opera Company.

He died on June 22, 1953, after a long illness at Wallick Point in Stamford, Connecticut. He is buried in Woodlawn Cemetery.

Operas
The White Bird
The Blonde Donna

Family 

Carter was a maternal grandson of the New York City publisher, John Fowler Trow (1810–1886).

Ernest famously double eloped on September 30, 1891, in New York City with Laura Hoe, daughter of the printing press inventor Robert Hoe III.  The other couple was Laura's older sister, Olivia Phelps Hoe who married Ernest's Princeton classmate, Robert Slake.  The scandal hit the front page of the New York newspapers and strained relations with his in-laws for years.

Ernest and Laura had three children:  Laura Hoe Carter (1899 - 1987), Roger Carter (1901 - 1992) and Elizabeth Carter Richards (1906 - abt 1982).

References

External links

1866 births
1953 deaths
American male composers
American composers
Princeton University alumni
People from Orange, New Jersey
Musicians from New Jersey
Columbia University alumni
American male organists
Burials at Woodlawn Cemetery (Bronx, New York)
American organists